Randy L. Borror is a former Republican member of the Indiana House of Representatives, representing the 84th District since 2001.

He grew up in Wells County, graduating from Bluffton High School before completing his bachelor's degree at Indiana University Bloomington.

References

External links
State Representative Randy L. Borror official Indiana State Legislature site
 

1957 births
Living people
Indiana University Bloomington alumni
Republican Party members of the Indiana House of Representatives
People from Bluffton, Indiana
Politicians from Fort Wayne, Indiana